Shu Yinbiao (born 1958) is currently the President of the International Electrotechnical Commission and Chairman of China Huaneng Group.

Biography
Shu Yinbiao is a native of Hebei province. He graduated from the North China Electric Power University in engineering, and joined the Chinese Communist Party (CCP) in 1985. He has spent his career in the state power administration. He is currently President of the IEC and Chairman of the China Huaneng Group Co.Ltd

2020 - President, IEC

2019 - Chairman of the China Huaneng Group Co.Ltd

2016 - Chairman, State Grid Corporation of China

2013 - General Manager, State Grid Corporation of China

2013 - Member, State Grid Corporation of China, Board of Directors

2007 - Doctor of Engineering Graduate, Wuhan University

2005 - Member, State Grid Corporation of China CCP, Leading Party Group  
  
2005 - 2013 Deputy General Manager, State Grid Corporation of China

2004 - 2005 Assistant General Manager, State Grid Corporation of China  
 
2002 - 2004 Director, State Grid Corporation of China, Engineering Construction Department  
 
2001 - 2002 Deputy Director, State Grid Corporation of China, Engineering Construction Department 
  
2000 - Master of Engineering, Wuhan University

1998—2001 Deputy Director, State Electric Power Corporation, National Electric Power Dispatching and Communication Center, Finance Division.

A senior engineer in power systems and automation, Shu was awarded his PhD from Wuhan University, China. He is currently President of the IEC. He is also a member of the Energy Experts Consultative Committee of the Chinese State Council, and Acting Chairman of CSEE (Chinese Society for Electrical Engineering). He is also an active member of IEEE.

He has been extensively involved in the technical research and management of power-grid planning, engineering, dispatch and operation. Shu has contributed to the development and application of power grid planning technology, UHV power transmission technology, and complex power grid operation and control. He has also focused on the integration of wind power, solar power and other new energy sources into grid technology and smart grid standardization.

References

1958 births
Living people
Businesspeople from Hebei
Chinese electrical engineers
Engineers from Hebei
State Grid Corporation of China people
North China Electric Power University alumni
Members of the Chinese Academy of Engineering